Pecos Bill is an Italian comic book series created by Guido Martina and Raffaele Paparella. The name is a reference to American folklore character Pecos Bill.

Background 
In 1949 the publisher Mondadori commissioned Guido Martina and Raffaele Paparella the creation of a new  realistic comic series, inspired by the legendary hero of the West, to alternate with the Disney stories in the series Albi D'Oro ("Golden Albums"). Despite the market of western comics was quite inflated (Tex, Piccolo sceriffo, Captain Miki, Kinowa) the Pecos Bill comics were quite successful. The comic version of Pecos Bill distinguished by the total rejection of the use of firearms (he was instead very skilled with the lasso) and by the characteristic of never killing his enemies. The series was published between 3 December 1949 and 31 March 1955.

References 

Pecos Bill
1949 comics debuts
1955 comics endings
Comics characters introduced in 1949
Italian comics characters
Italian comics titles
Western (genre) comics